Leslie S. Gara (born February 6, 1963) is a Democratic former member of the Alaska House of Representatives, having represented the 23rd district from 2003 to 2019. Gara is also a former assistant attorney general and part owner of a local restaurant in Anchorage, Snow City Cafe.

Gara graduated from Boston University in 1985 with a Bachelor of Arts in history. He then earned his Juris Doctor from Harvard Law School in 1988. He is of Iraqi-Jewish descent.

In June 2018, Gara announced he would not be running for re-election.

On September 21, 2021, Gara announced that he would run for governor in 2022. He has criticized incumbent governor Mike Dunleavy for cutting funding for public education at the University of Alaska system. He supports "responsible development" of oil and has vowed to improve energy efficiency standards and address climate change, while opposing construction of Pebble Mine to protect fisheries. He also has pledged to protect access to Abortion in Alaska.

He supports ranking former governor Bill Walker second in the governor's election under Ranked-choice voting.

References

External links

 Les Gara for Governor campaign website
 Profile at the Alaska Legislature (archived)
 Les Gara at 100 Years of Alaska's Legislature

|-

1963 births
21st-century American politicians
Alaska lawyers
American people of Iraqi-Jewish descent
American politicians of Arab descent
Boston University alumni
Harvard Law School alumni
Jewish American state legislators in Alaska
Living people
Democratic Party members of the Alaska House of Representatives
Politicians from Anchorage, Alaska
Politicians from New York City
21st-century American Jews